Das Gesicht im Spiegel (The Face in the Mirror) is an opera in 16 scenes by Jörg Widmann, with a libretto in German by Roland Schimmelpfennig. The opera is about the emotional consequences and ethical issues of human cloning. The opera was premiered at the Cuvilliés Theatre in Munich on 17 July 2003, conducted by Peter Rundel.

Background and performance history
Jörg Widmann received in 2000 a commission from the Bavarian State Opera for the 2003 Munich Opera Festival. Sir Peter Jonas, manager of the Bavarian State Opera, commissioned an opera that would address a contemporary issue. The libretto by Roland Schimmelpfennig deals with the emotional consequences and ethical issues of human cloning. The stage work was composed from 2002 to 2003 and finished in Freiburg on 11 June 2003.

The opera was premiered at the Cuvilliés Theatre Munich on 17 July 2003, with the Orchestra of the Bavarian State Opera conducted by Peter Rundel and Tölzer Knabenchor. Das Gesicht im Spiegel, Widmann's first full-length work, was chosen by critics of the Opernwelt as the most important premiere of the season 2003–2004. The opera was also performed two years later in Theater Krefeld und Mönchengladbach conducted by Kenneth Duryea. In March 2010 a revised version of the opera was premiered in Opernhaus Düsseldorf conducted by Axel Kober.

Roles

Instrumentation
The opera uses a small orchestra, with only 23 players.
 Woodwinds: 2 flutes, 2 clarinets (A, B), 2 bassoons
 Brass: 2 horns (F), trumpet (C), trombone
 Strings: 4 violins, 3 cellos, double bass
 Percussion: 2 players
 piano, guitar, accordion

Synopsis
The opera in sixteen scenes can be divided in three parts:

Scene 1–5
 The dependence of the biotech company owner on stock-market fluctuations

Scene 6–10
 Exposure of the clone to the outside world

Scene 11–16
 Problems that arise from a love triangle

Notes

References

Citations

Bibliography

Further reading
 
 
 

Operas by Jörg Widmann
German-language operas
2003 operas
Operas